Many international and national figure skating competitions are organized yearly. The three levels of ISU international competition are senior, junior, and advanced novice. Non-elite skaters may also compete in 'Adult' competitions. 'Professional' competitions were contested mainly by former elite skaters or sometimes a mix of eligible and ineligible skaters if sanctioned by the ISU.

List of competitions

A-C
Adagio Pairs – The Improv on Ice
Aegon Challenge Cup (Later renamed to International Challenge Cup)
Afriskate
Alpen Trophy (also known as Inge Solar Memorial - Alpen Trophy)
Asian Figure Skating Trophy
Asko Cup
Autumn Trophy
Avas Cup
Baltic Cup (Junior Grand Prix event)
Bavarian Open
Bayerische Jugendmeisterschaften
Belgrade Trophy
Beskydske Piruety
Blue Swords (Junior Grand Prix event)
Bofrost Cup on Ice (Grand Prix event until 2003)
Bosphorus Cup
Brno Cup (EC)
Centennial on Ice
 Challenge Cup
Challenge of Champions
Challenger Series (circuit)
Champions Series (Later renamed to Grand Prix Series)
Christmas Cup
Continents Cup
Coupe du Nice
Coppa Europa(European criterium)
Coupe du Printemps
Coupe Haabersti
Crystal Skate of Romania
Crystal Skate (Rostelecom), a novice event
Cup of Berlin
Cup of China (Grand Prix event)
Cup of Nice
Cup of Russia (Grand Prix event)
Cup of Tyrol
Czech Skate

D-F
Denkova-Staviski Cup (sometimes Challenger Series)
Diamentowy Spin
Dragon Trophy (senior, junior, and novice international)
Ennia Challenge Cup (Later renamed to International Challenge Cup)
Egna Dance Trophy
Egna Spring Trophy
EduSport Trophy
European Criterium (series)
European Figure Skating Championships (ISU championship)
FBMA Trophy
European Youth Olympic Festival (junior international)
Finlandia Trophy (Challenger Series)
Four Continents Figure Skating Championships (ISU championship)
Four Nationals Figure Skating Championships
French Cup (synchronized skating)

G-I
Gardena Spring Trophy (Later renamed to Egna Spring Trophy) (junior and novice international) 
The Gold Championship
Golden Bear of Zagreb
The Golden Lynx
Golden Spin of Zagreb (Challenger Series)
Goodwill Games (multi-sport event)
Grand Prix (circuit)
Grand Prix of Bratislava
Grand Prix International St. Gervais
Grand Prix Oswiecim
Grand Prix Final (Grand Prix event)
Grand Prix SNP (Junior Grand Prix event)
Haabersti Cup
Hershey’s Kisses Challenge
Heiko-Fischer-Pokal
Helena Pajovic Cup (Later renamed to Skate Helena)
Hellmut Seibt Memorial
Hessenpokal
Ice Challenge (Challenger Series)
Icelab International Cup
Ice Mall Cup
Ice Star
Ice Wars (Professional competition)
Ina Bauer Pokal
Inclusive Skating International Event
Inge Solar Memorial - Alpen Trophy
International Adult Figure Skating Competition
International Challenge Cup
International Cup of Nice
International Halloween Cup
International Ice Dance Cup (better known as International Trophy of Lyon)
International Trophy of Lyon
Istanbul Cup

J-L
Japan Open
Jégvirág Cup
Junior Grand Prix (series)
Junior World Challenge Cup
Karl Schäfer Memorial (senior international)
Kaunas Ice Autumn Cup
Kaunas Ice Christmas Cup
Kaunas Ice Winter Cup
Kempen Trophy
Kennedy Memorial Winter Games (multi-sport event)
Keri Lotion Classic
Lake Placid Ice Dance International
Liberec Trophy
Lombardia Trophy (sometimes Challenger Series)
Lumičre Cup (synchronized skating)
Lysiane Lauret Challenge

M-O
Master's de Patinage
Medal Winners Open
Merano Cup
Mexican Open International Skating Competition
Mini Europa
Mladost Trophy
Mont Blanc Trophy
Montfort Cup
Mordovian Ornament (sometimes Challenger Series)
Mountain Cup
Narcisa Cup
Nations Cup (see Bofrost Cup)
Nebelhorn Trophy (Challenger Series)
Neuchâtel Trophy
New Year's Cup
NHK Trophy (Grand Prix event)
Nordic Figure Skating Championships (novice, junior, and senior international)
North American Challenge Skate (below-Senior international.)
North American Figure Skating Championships (international. No longer held.)
NRW Trophy (novice, junior, and senior international)
Oceania International Novice Figure Skating Competition
Olympic Games
Olympic Hopes
Ondrej Nepela Trophy (Challenger Series)
Open d'Andorra

P-S
Pavel Roman Memorial
Philadelphia Summer International
Piruetten
PFSA Trophy or Trophy of the PFSA
Prague Cup
Prague Ice Cup (former Prague Riedell Ice Cup)
Prague Skate
Precision Finland International
Reykjavik International Games
Richmond Trophy
Rooster Cup 
Rostelecom Cup (Grand Prix event)
Rozmaring Trophy (European Criterium)
Rotary Watches International
Salchow Trophy (Junior Grand Prix event)
Santa Claus Cup
Sarajevo Open
SBC Cup (Junior Grand Prix event)
Shanghai Trophy
Skate America (Grand Prix event)
Skate Canada Autumn Classic (sometimes Challenger Series)
Skate Canada International (Grand Prix event)
Skate Celje (European Criterium)
Skate Copenhagen
Skate Down Under
Skate Electric
Skate Helena (European Criterium)
Skate Israel (senior international)
Slovenia Open
Sofia Trophy (European Criterium)
Sparkassen Cup on Ice (later renamed Bofrost Cup)
Sportland Trophy (European Criterium)
Spring Cup
St. Ivel International

T-W
Tallinn Cup
Tallink Hotels Cup
Tallinn Trophy (sometimes Challenger Series)
Team Challenge Cup
Tirnavia Ice Cup
Tivoli Cup
Toruń Cup (former Mentor Nestlé Nesquik Toruń Cup)
Triglav Trophy (senior, junior, and novice international)
Trophée de France (Grand Prix event) (former Trophée Éric Bompard and Trophée Lalique)
Trophy of the PFSA or PFSA Trophy
Ukrainian Open (senior international)
Universiade (senior international)
U.S. International Figure Skating Classic (Challenger Series)
Volvo Open Cup (sometimes Challenger Series)
Warsaw Cup (Challenger Series)
Winter Olympics
Winter Universiade
Winter Youth Olympics
World Development Trophy
World Figure Skating Championships (ISU championship)
World Junior Figure Skating Championships (ISU championship)
World Professional Figure Skating Championships (Professional competition)
World Synchronized Skating Championships
World Junior Synchronized Skating Championships
World Team Trophy

X-Z
Zagreb Snowflakes Trophy (synchronized skating)

References
ISU Official Homepage
The Figure Skating Corner
Ice Skating International Online
Planete Patinage
Skateweb
Skatebase
Tracings : A figure skating resource
Figure Skating Online
Stats on Ice
Golden Skate

List
Competitions